Isodemis is a genus of moths belonging to the subfamily Tortricinae of the family Tortricidae.

The genus was erected by Alexey Diakonoff in 1952 for the type species Batodes serpentinana. Diakonoff (1976, 1983) transferred Tortrix illiberalis to Isodemis and described Isodemis stenotera from Sumatra. Józef Razowski (2000, 2009) described Isodemis proxima from Taiwan, and Isodemis brevicera, Isodemis longicera and Isodemis ngoclinha from Vietnam. Currently, Isodemis consists of twelve species, mainly distributed in South-east Asia.

Diagnosis
Isodemis is characterized by the labial palpus obliquely uprising almost as high as the upper edge of the eye. The forewing is dominantly yellowish brown or ochreous brown, the median fascia is interrupted or indistinct near the costal margin. The male genitalia have a hooked gnathos and the valva have a C-shaped plica, with numerous fine wrinkles between the plica and costa. The female genitalia usually have a ductus bursae with a cestum and the single dentate signum with a conspicuous globular process placed posteriorly in the corpus bursae.

Distribution
China, Vietnam, Thailand, Indonesia, Nepal, India and Sri Lanka.

Species
Isodemis brevicera Razowski, 2009
Isodemis guangxiensis Sun & Li, 2011
Isodemis hainanensis Sun & Li, 2011
Isodemis illiberalis (Meyrick, 1918)
Isodemis longicera Razowski, 2009
Isodemis ngoclinha Razowski, 2009
Isodemis phloiosignum Razowski, 2013
Isodemis proxima Razowski, 2000
Isodemis quadrata Sun & Li, 2011
Isodemis serpentinana (Walker, 1863)
Isodemis solea Razowski, 2013
Isodemis stenotera Diakonoff, 1983

See also
List of Tortricidae genera

References

External links

tortricidae.com

Archipini
Tortricidae genera